Ragusa is the historical name of Dubrovnik. It may also refer to:

Places

Croatia 
 the Republic of Ragusa (or Republic of Dubrovnik), the maritime city-state of Ragusa
 Cavtat (historically  in Italian), a town in Dubrovnik-Neretva County, Croatia

Italy 
 Ragusa, Sicily, an Italian city and commune in Sicily
 Ragusa Ibla, a historic quarter of the Sicilian city
 Province of Ragusa, Italy, one of the administrative divisions of Sicily

People
 Ragusa (surname)
 Auguste de Marmont (1774–1852), Duke of Ragusa, Napoleonic soldier
 Geoffrey, Count of Ragusa, son of Roger I of Sicily

Other
 City of Ragusa, a sailboat
 Ragusa (chocolate), a range of products from Swiss chocolate-maker Camille Bloch, taking their name from the Croatian town.
 Ragusa (horse), a racehorse
 Ragusa Calcio, an Italian association football club located in Ragusa, Italy
 University of Ragusa, located in Ragusa and Ragusa Ibla, Italy, and founded in 1998

See also
 Ragusan (disambiguation)